Abdul Gaffar (born 5 October 1993) is a Bangladeshi cricketer. He made his List A debut for Shinepukur Cricket Club in the 2017–18 Dhaka Premier Division Cricket League on 8 March 2018. He made his first-class debut for Rajshahi Division in the 2018–19 National Cricket League on 15 October 2018. He made his Twenty20 debut on 5 June 2021, for Brothers Union in the 2021 Dhaka Premier Division Twenty20 Cricket League.

References

External links
 

1993 births
Living people
Bangladeshi cricketers
Brothers Union cricketers
Rajshahi Division cricketers
Shinepukur Cricket Club cricketers
Place of birth missing (living people)